Without Her may refer to:

 "Without Her" (Ringo Starr song), 1970
 "Without Her" (Harry Nilsson song), 1967
 Without Her (2006 film), a Canadian thriller film
 Without Her (2022 film), an Iranian drama mystery thriller film